Fereydun Sahabi (born in 1937 in Tehran, Iran) is an Iranian academic, writer, translator, and social activist. He was the first president of the Atomic Energy Organization of Iran and the second in the administration of President of Iran after the Iranian revolution.

Early life 
He was the third son of Yadollah Sahabi and the brother of Ezzatollah Sahabi. Fereydun Sahabi was born in Iran in 1937. He did an MPhil in geology and exploration of petroleum from the University of London.

Career 
After returning to Iran, he worked as a professor at the University of Tehran.

Political activities 
Sahabi was a member of the National Front at the University of Tehran. He was active in the European Student Confederation. He was elected as a member of the Freedom Movement of Iran in 1979. After the Iranian Revolution, he was elected as the Undersecretary of the Ministry of Energy and the first president of the Atomic Energy Organization of Iran.

Books 
 Geology of petroleum, University of Tehran Press, 2012
 Sedimentary petrology, University of Tehran Press, 2008

See also 
 Yadollah Sahabi
 Ezzatollah Sahabi
 Atomic Energy Organization of Iran
 Nuclear program of Iran
 Nasrollah Khadem

References

Sources 
 Etemad newspaper, Interview with Fereydon Sahabi, 1556, page 7, 1986, Iran.
 Magazine of mine engineering
 Aligholi, Abbas; Kiani, Ehsan; Samadieh magazine, p. 315,316, 2016.
 Neyshaburi, N., "The last collapse of Persians", P. 673, 2013, USA.
 Patrikarakos, David, Nuclear Iran: The Birth of an Atomic State, I.B. Tauris and Co LTD, 2012

External links 
 Patrikarakos, David, Nuclear Iran: The Birth of an Atomic State, I.B. Tauris and Co LTD, 2012
 Melman, Yossi; Javedanfar, Meir, The Nuclear Sphinx of Tehran: Mahmoud Ahmadinejad and the State of Iran, Carroll and Graf Publishers, 2008

Living people
1937 births
Iranian geologists
Presidents of the Atomic Energy Organization of Iran
Alumni of the University of London
Academic staff of the University of Tehran
Freedom Movement of Iran politicians
National Front (Iran) student activists
Members of the Iranian Committee for the Defense of Freedom and Human Rights